Pseudomonas delhiensis is a Gram-negative bacterium isolated from the dumping site of fly ash of a power plant in Delhi, India. The type strain is MTCC 7601.

References

Pseudomonadales
Bacteria described in 2007